Carpentersville is a village in Kane County, Illinois, United States. The population was 37,983 at the 2020 census.

Geography
Carpentersville is located at  (42.121156, -88.274679).

History
Julius Angelo Carpenter (August 19, 1827 – March 30, 1880) was the founder of Carpentersville, Illinois and its first prominent citizen. Carpenter came with his family from Uxbridge, Massachusetts and settled near the Fox River, along with his father Charles Valentine Carpenter and his uncle Daniel. Angelo was the first person to settle Carpentersville. Carpenter built the settlement's first store, bridge, and factory. He served two consecutive terms in the Illinois House of Representatives. In 1837, the brothers, en route to the Rock River, made camp along the east bank of the Fox River to wait out the spring floods that made continuing their oxcart journey impossible. They ended up staying in the area to settle what was then called Carpenters' Grove.

For the next hundred years, Carpentersville did not grow as rapidly as other Fox River communities which had more direct rail connections to Chicago. The electric interurban railroad came to Carpentersville in 1896. The line was built by the Carpentersville, Elgin and Aurora Railway from a connection with the streetcar system in Elgin, Illinois and ran for four miles, terminating at the Illinois Iron and Bolt foundry on Main Street. This company changed ownership several times, including the Aurora, Elgin and Chicago Railway. It ended up being owned by the Aurora, Elgin and Fox River Electric Company in 1924. This line was always operated separately from the rest of the system, which included all traction lines between Carpentersville and Yorkville. This was a great convenience to factory workers who traveled to Elgin and for Elgin workers to come to Carpentersville. The line was used by everyone to enjoy Elgin's Trout Park and to enjoy the "summer cars" for a cool ride. The line started to fail with the onset of the Great Depression and the establishment and paving of Illinois Route 31, which encouraged automobile use and the creation of a bus route. The final blow came in 1933, when a tornado destroyed the bridge over the Fox River just south of West Dundee.

Until the 1950s, Carpentersville consisted of a street grid along the Fox River centered on Main Street, which was the only highway bridge across the Fox River between Algonquin and Dundee. The Meadowdale Shopping Center, which was anchored by Wieboldt's, Carson Pirie Scott, Cook's and W.T. Grant; it also featured an indoor ice skating rink, overshadowed the commercial district along the River. A large section of the shopping mall on the north side was torn down in the 1990s and a new post office building was built.

In 1956, to reflect this population shift, Dundee Community High School relocated from its former site on Illinois Route 31 to Cleveland Avenue (now Carpentersville Middle School). In 1964, a second high school, named for Irving Crown, opened on Kings Road on the northern edge of Meadowdale. The two schools have now merged. DeLacey (one of the schools built on Kings Road) was closed and demolished, and was remade on Cleveland Ave.

The site is now a Township Park and County Forest Preserve.

In the 1990s and 2000s, Carpentersville began to expand is development further west along Randall Road with the construction of many new subdivisions and shopping centers that including Woodman's Markets and Menards.

Governance
Carpentersville operates under the council-manager form of government in which an elected Board, consisting of the President (chief elected official) and six Trustees, appoints a professional manager to oversee the day-to-day operation of government services and programs. The council-manager form of government combines the leadership of elected officials with the experience of a professional manager.

The current office holders are:

 John Skillman, Village President

Village Trustees
 Jeff Frost
 Humberto Garcia
 Roberta (Bobbie) Andresen
 John O'Sullivan
 Maria Vela
 Jim Malone

Local school districts
 Community Unit School District 300 including Dundee-Crown High School and Carpentersville Middle School.
 Barrington Community Unit School District 220

Demographics

2020 census

Note: the US Census treats Hispanic/Latino as an ethnic category. This table excludes Latinos from the racial categories and assigns them to a separate category. Hispanics/Latinos can be of any race.

2010 Census
As of the census of 2010, there were 37,691 people and 11,583 households in the village. The racial makeup of the village was 62.9% White, 6.8% African American, 0.5% Native American, 5.5% Asian, 0.04% Pacific Islander, 20.9% other races, and 3.2% from two or more races. Hispanic or Latino of any race were 50.1% of the population.

For the census of 2000, there were 30,586 people, 8,872 households, and 7,239 families residing in the village. The racial makeup of the village was 68.76% White, 4.18% African American, 0.64% Native American, 1.98% Asian, 0.10% Pacific Islander, 20.83% from other races, and 3.50% from two or more races. Hispanic or Latino of any race were 40.57% of the population.

There were 8,872 households, out of which 48.6% had children under the age of 18 living with them, 63.1% were married couples living together, 11.5% had a female householder with no husband present, and 18.4% were non-families. 13.9% of all households were made up of individuals, and 3.9% had someone living alone who was 65 years of age or older. The average household size was 3.45 and the average family size was 3.77.

In the village, the population was spread out, with 33.2% under the age of 18, 10.9% from 18 to 24, 35.4% from 25 to 44, 15.3% from 45 to 64, and 5.3% who were 65 years of age or older. The median age was 28 years. For every 100 females, there were 106.7 males. For every 100 females age 18 and over, there were 106.2 males.

The median income for a household in the village was $54,526, and the median income for a family was $55,921. Males had a median income of $38,052 versus $26,957 for females. The per capita income for the village was $17,424. About 6.7% of families and 8.5% of the population were below the poverty line, including 11.5% of those under age 18 and 4.2% of those age 65 or over.

Attractions
 Cinema 12
 Carpenter Park
 Meadowdale Shopping Center, including a Walmart Supercenter, which opened in 2016.
 Spring Hill Mall (partially — shared with West Dundee)
 Platt Hill Nursery
 Carpentersville Dam
 Raceway Woods Forest Preserve

Latino Integration

Carpentersville underwent a rapid transition from majority white to majority Hispanic. In 1990, the census showed a Hispanic population of 17% which increased to 40.6% in 2000, 50.1% in 2010, and 56.3% in 2020.

The church of Iglesias San Esteban Martir has been a contributing factor to the increase in Hispanics in Carpentersville. It hosts an annual mobile consulate from The Consulate General of Mexico in Chicago to apply for an identification card or a ‘matricula’. On average they issue around 300 per day. Bank of America has also helped host the mobile unit as it provides a method for Hispanics to be able to open a bank account. It provides a way for them to take out loans for home ownership and are also able to send up to $3,000 cash to Mexico if they desire.

In 2007, the Village of Carpentersville passed an ordinance making English the official language of the village requiring that all government meetings and notices be conducted or written in English only; the bill was introduced by village board trustee members, Judy Sigwalt and Paul Humpfer. Despite protests outside of village hall by the Hispanic community, the ordinance passed 5–2.

Nearby communities (Algonquin, Huntley, Lake in the Hills, Gilberts, Sleepy Hollow, West Dundee, East Dundee, Pingree Grove) have also seen an increase to their Latino population, although at a more gradual pace, resulting in more integrated communities.

Notable residents
Kenneth Hawkinson, president of Kutztown University of Pennsylvania
Bradie Tennell, winner of the 2015 U.S. Figure Skating Championships and 2018 U.S. Figure Skating Championships ladies competition.

See also

 Dundee Township Historic District

References

External links

 Village website

 
1837 establishments in Illinois
Chicago metropolitan area
Populated places established in 1837
Villages in Illinois
Villages in Kane County, Illinois
Majority-minority cities and towns in Kane County, Illinois